Erol Sabanov (born 16 May 1974) is a German former footballer of Turkish Bulgarian origin who played as a goalkeeper. He is currently the assistant manager and goalkeeper coach of Stuttgarter Kickers.

Career
Of Turkish descent, Sabanov began his career with VfR Aalen, and spent nine years playing for the first-team, in the Oberliga Baden-Württemberg and later the Regionalliga Süd after the club won promotion in 1999. In 2002, he signed for 1. FC Saarbrücken, with whom he won promotion to the 2. Bundesliga in 2004. He played the first two matches of the 2003–04 season at this level, but lost his place to Peter Eich, and left the club in November 2004. In January 2005, Sabanov signed for Jahn Regensburg, where he spent eighteen months, leaving in 2006 after the club were relegated from the Regionalliga Süd. He spent a year with SSV Reutlingen, serving as understudy to Marco Langner, before joining 1. FC Heidenheim of the Oberliga Baden-Württemberg in 2007.

Sabanov was Heidenheim's first choice 'keeper as they won promotion to the Regionalliga Süd in his first season, and to the 3. Liga the following year. He lost his place to Frank Lehmann for the 2011–12 season, but won it back eleven games into the following season. He retired at the end of the 2013–14 season, having helped Heidenheim win promotion to the 2. Bundesliga.

References

External links

1974 births
Living people
German footballers
Association football goalkeepers
German people of Turkish descent
VfR Aalen players
1. FC Saarbrücken players
SSV Jahn Regensburg players
SSV Reutlingen 05 players
1. FC Heidenheim players
2. Bundesliga players
3. Liga players
People from Aalen
Sportspeople from Stuttgart (region)
Footballers from Baden-Württemberg